This is a list of notable people who were born in or have been residents of Workington, a coastal town and civil parish at the mouth of the River Derwent on the west coast in the Allerdale borough of Cumbria, England.

Arts and academics 
Troy Donockley (born 1964), Workington-born player of uilleann pipes, a member of Nightwish
Kathleen Ferrier Order of the British Empire (1912–1953) won the prestigious Gold Cup at the 1938 Workington Musical Festival.
Arthur Guirdham (1905–1992), physician, psychiatrist, novelist and author, wrote on the Cathar sect, alternative medicine, extrasensory perception and reincarnation.
Percy Kelly (1918–1993), Workington-born artist, best known for his watercolours and charcoal paintings of the Lake District
Gordon Preston (1925–2015), mathematician, was best known for his work on semigroups.
Alan Tarney (born 1945), songwriter, producer and bassist for The Shadows.

Business 
Paul Dale (born 1970) was the first chief technology officer appointed to the management board at ITV plc, the UK's largest commercial television network.

Politics and diplomacy 
Dale Norman Campbell-Savours (born 1943), Labour politician and Member of Parliament (MP) for Workington in 1979–2001, now sits in the House of Lords. Before becoming an MP he was managing director of a watch-making business.
Thomas Cape  (1868–1947), Labour politician and Member of Parliament (MP) for Workington in 1918–1945
Sir Thomas Anthony Cunningham (born 16 September 1952), known as Tony Cunningham, is a British Labour Party politician who was the Member of Parliament (MP) for Workington in 2001–2015.
Sir Joseph Brian Donnelly , OBE,  (living), diplomat, was the son of a Workington steelworker, educated at Workington Grammar School and Oxford University.
Sue Hayman, Baroness Hayman of Ullock (born 28 July 1962) is a British Labour politician and life peer. She was the Member of Parliament (MP) for Workington in 2015–2019.
Mark Jenkinson, a Conservative politician and Member of Parliament (MP) for Workington since 2019
Fred Peart (1914–1988), was Member of Parliament for Workington from 1945 to 1976. He was made a life peer in 1976 and served as Leader of the House of Lords and Lord Privy Seal.

Sports 
Jonathon Woods (born 1889, date of death unknown), footballer
Jim Brough (1903–1986), rugby union and rugby league English international player
John Burridge (born 1951), goalkeeper
Mark Cueto (born 1979), English international rugby union player
Scott Dobie (born 1978), Carlisle United and Scotland international footballer
Brian Edgar (born 1936), rugby league Great Britain international player
Jon Roper (born 5 May 1976) was a professional rugby league footballer in the 1990s and 2000s.
Sol Roper John Roper (born 1936), also known by the nickname Sol, was an English professional rugby league footballer in the 1950s and 1960s, who coached in the 1960s and 1970s.
Bill Shankly (1913–1981), manager of Workington A.F.C.
Malcolm Wilson (born 1956), rally driver and rally-team owner

War 
James Alexander Smith VC (1881–1968), Workington-born soldier of the 3rd Battalion, Border Regiment during World War I

References

Workington